The Wooden Tserkvas of the Carpathian Region in Poland and Ukraine are a group of wooden Orthodox (and some Eastern Catholic) churches (in Ukrainian, церкви tserkvy) located in Poland and Ukraine which were inscribed in 2013 on the UNESCO World Heritage List which explains:

Inscribed Tserkvas

See also
 Vernacular architecture of the Carpathians
 Carpathian Wooden Churches
 Wooden churches of Southern Lesser Poland
 Wooden churches in Ukraine
 Wooden churches of the Slovak Carpathians
 Wooden churches of Maramureș

References

World Heritage Sites in Poland
World Heritage Sites in Ukraine